Lars Ernst Johannes Dracke (21 March 1925 – 12 September 2000) was a Swedish curler.

He was a 1966 Swedish men's curling champion.

He was employed as a dentist.

Teams

References

External links
 

1925 births
2000 deaths
Sportspeople from Stockholm
Swedish male curlers
Swedish curling champions
Swedish dentists
20th-century Swedish people